The Natashas Project is a modern dance company that aims to increase awareness of modern slavery and human trafficking in the United Kingdom and internationally. It was founded in 2012 by Erena Bordon Sanchez and receives funding from the Arts Council England.

References

Further reading
Malarek, Victor. (2004) The Natashas: Inside the new global sex trade. Arcade Publishing.

External links 
Official website.
The Natashas Project at YouTube.

Organizations that combat human trafficking
Non-profit organisations based in the United Kingdom
Modern dance companies